Octavio Muciño Valdés (14 May 1950 – 3 June 1974) was a Mexican professional footballer who played as a centre-forward and midfield for Cruz Azul and Guadalajara as well as the Mexico national football team.

Muciño was born in Jasso, Hidalgo where he played in Cruz Azul's youth academy until his debut with the senior team in 1969. During his time at Cruz Azul, Muciño won 3 league titles and 2 continental cups. His only season with Guadalajara, he managed to become the team's top goal scorer with 15 goals. At the time of his death, Muciño was regarded as a key player for the Mexico national football team alongside Enrique Borja. Along with Borja, Muciño is often cited to be one of the greatest Mexican forwards of his generation.

In the early hours of May 31, 1974, Muciño was shot 3 times outside of a restaurant by 32-year old Jaime Antonio Muldoon Barreto, an engineer with whom he had a physical confrontation earlier in the evening. Muciño succumbed to his injuries and died 3 days later at a hospital in Guadalajara. Muldoon Barreto left for Europe shortly after and never stood trial for the murder when he returned to Mexico years later. Muldoon Barreto's freedom is widely attributed to his family's high status and ties with the government of Jalisco.

Early life 

Octavio Muciño Valdés was born to Roberto Muciño Martínez, a mechanic, and Genoveva Valdés in Jasso, Hidalgo on May 14, 1950. He had 2 brothers and 1 sister. His father, Roberto Muciño Martínez, was also a footballer who played for Cruz Azul during both the club's amateur and professional eras. Muciño Martínez was part of the squad which won the club's promotional title in the 1963–64 season and subsequently played in the Primera División de México. Muciño Valdés was encouraged by his father to pursue a career in football.

Club career

Cruz Azul 
Muciño had enrolled in Cruz Azul's youth team at the age of 7. At the age of 19, he was debuted with the senior team during the 1969–70 Mexican Primera División season against C.F. Monterrey on November 19, 1969. Muciño scored his first senior league goal on March 29, 1970 in the México 1970 tournament against Laguna. Cruz Azul went on to win the México 1970 competition, with Muciño netting a total of 14 league goals at the end of the season .

Guadalajara 

In 1973, Muciño was transferred to C.D. Guadalajara for a fee of about 1 million pesos.

The team had been undergoing poor performances in the league for a number of seasons at this point, ending the 1973–74 season 11th on the general table. In spite of this, Muciño established himself as a fan favorite and key player, netting 15 goals in 26 games becoming the team's top goal scorer.

Muciño played his final match with Guadalajara on April 21, 1971 in a 1-0 loss against Club Jalisco.

At the time of his death, there had been transfer negotiations between Guadalajara and Atlas where Muciño would be exchanged for Ricardo Chavarín

Personal life 
Muciño was nicknamed El Centavo due to his small stature as a child. He had one child, Octavio Muciño Jr., who was born February 1, 1973.

International career

At the age of 21, Muciño debuted for the Mexico national football team on July 6, 1971 in a friendly match against Greece.

Muciño scored his first and second international goals on December 4, 1971 against Honduras in the 1971 CONCACAF Championship. Mexico would win the competition largely in part of his goals.

Muciño was a key figure in the 1973 CONCACAF Championship, which doubled as CONCACAF's 1974 FIFA World Cup qualification, starting in all of Mexico's 5 games. Muciño scored 4 goals in a 8 - 0 win against the Netherlands Antilles, becoming Mexico's top goal scorer in the competition. Muciño played his final match international match on December 18, 1973 in a 1-0 win against Haiti in the competition.

Death

Murder
At approximately 11 on night of May 30, 1974, Muciño met with 3 friends and their dates at Carlos O’ Willys, a fine dining restaurant frequented by wealthy patrons located in Guadalajara. A few tables away from where Muciño's party was situated, sat 32-year-old Jaime Antonio Muldoon Barreto. Muldoon Barreto was described to be in an inebriated state. Purportedly a fan of Guadalajara's rival team Atlas, Muldoon Barreto recognized Muciño and walked towards his table and began to discuss football with him. Eventually, Muldoon Barreto began to antagonize and hurl insults towards Muciño and his date which escalated into a physical altercation between the two men. The two were broken up by fellow patrons and Muldoon Barreto was thrown out of restaurant. Approximately an hour and a half later, Muciño and his group left the restaurant. Muldoon Barreto was inside a luxury car near the entrance of the restaurant, apparently waiting for Muciño to exit. Muciño wishing to make peace with Muldoon Barreto, extended his hand for a handshake. Muldoon Barreto, however, immediately shot Muciño point-blank 3 times with a .25 ACP, once in the head, thorax, and shoulder. Muldoon Barreto then sped off the area evading capture. Muciño was taken to Hospital México Americano where he was in a coma for 3 days. At approximately 5:30 in the morning on June 3, 1974, Muciño died from his injuries.

Aftermath
News of Muciño's death quickly spread and shocked the city of Guadalajara and Mexico City. Angered football fans vandalized and attempted to set fire to Carlos O’ Willys. Thousands of fans attended Muciño's funeral held in Jasso, Hidalgo, where he was subsequently buried.

According to Muciño's son, a month or two after the murder occurred, Jaime Antonio Muldoon Barreto left Mexico for Spain, where there did not exist an extradition treaty between the two countries. When he returned to Mexico in 1980, Muldoon Barreto's lawyers cited poor mental faculties as reason he was unfit to stand trial. Muldoon Barreto was subsequently never prosecuted for Muciño's murder and remained free.

Perpetrator
Jaime Antonio Muldoon Barreto (born 1942) was a mechanical-electrical engineer who belonged to a wealthy architecture and real estate family based in Guadalajara. Muldoon Barreto graduated from Monterrey Institute of Technology and Higher Education in 1967. Muldoon Barreto's freedom is widely attributed to the influence and power possessed by the Muldoon Barreto family in the Mexican government.

Legacy 
Despite his short career, Muciño established himself as an important figure in both Cruz Azul and Mexican football. Muciño is often cited to be one of Cruz Azul's integral players who had helped achieve the club's rapid rise to prominence in the 1970s. Along with Enrique Borja, whose career statistics rivaled that of Muciño's, he is often deemed to be one of the greatest Mexican footballers of his generation.

On June 3, 2009, 35 years after his death, Octavio Muciño was inducted into Cruz Azul's hall of fame. A ceremony was held with Muciño's family in attendance as well as former teammate Alberto Quintano. In November 2011, Muciño was honored in a similar fashion by Guadalajara having Muciño's number 9 shirt inducted into the club's museum.

Career statistics

Club

International 

Scores and results list Muciño's goal tally first, score column indicates score after each Mexico goal.

Honours 
Cruz Azul
 CONCACAF Champions' Cup: 1970, 1971
 Mexican Primera División: 1968–69, México 1970, 1971-1972, 1972-1973
 Campeón de Campeones: 1973
National team
 CONCACAF Championship: 1971

See also 
 Fernando Bustos
 Salvador Cabañas
 Andrés Escobar
 Tommy Ball
 Luciano Re Cecconi

References

External links 
 National Team statistics on 11v11
 
 
 Short overview and summary of career
 Interview with Mucino's son.
 Interview with immediate family members
 1971 CONCACAF Nations Cup

1950 births
1974 deaths
1974 murders in Mexico
Male murder victims
People murdered in Mexico
Mexican murder victims
Deaths by firearm in Mexico
Association football forwards
Mexican footballers
Mexico international footballers
Cruz Azul footballers
C.D. Guadalajara footballers
Liga MX players
CONCACAF Gold Cup-winning players